Timo Lavikainen (born 1972) is a Finnish actor. He lives in Joensuu.

Filmography

References

External links 

 

1972 births
Living people
Finnish male actors